Hayden Kays (born 1985 in London) is a British artist. He is influenced by the pop art from the '50s, but has most ties with street art.
He often uses a typewriter (font) in his artworks.  He has sold art to celebrities such as Chris Martin, Harry Styles and Noel Fielding.

His works were collected in a monograph book in 2013, named Hayden Kays Is An Artist.

In 2014, he made the cover art for rock bands The Kooks  and the Tribes (band).

Between 2012 and 2014 Kays illustrated an anecdotal column for London’s Ham&High, written by journalist Adam Sonin, based on English Heritage’s Blue Plaque scheme, called Behind Closed Doors.

References

Further reading
 
 
 
 

Street artists
1985 births
English graffiti artists
Living people